Hamilton North and Bellshill may mean or refer to:

 Hamilton North and Bellshill (UK Parliament constituency)
 Hamilton North and Bellshill (Scottish Parliament constituency)